David Hildyard (15 May 1916 – 19 February 2008) was an English sound engineer. He won two Academy Awards in the category Best Sound. His brother Jack Hildyard was a British cinematographer who worked on more than 80 films during his career.

Selected filmography
 Fiddler on the Roof (1971)
 Cabaret (1972)

References

External links

1916 births
2008 deaths
English audio engineers
Film people from London
Best Sound BAFTA Award winners
Best Sound Mixing Academy Award winners